Perovo is a rural locality (a village) in Gorod Vyazniki, Vyaznikovsky District, Vladimir Oblast, Russia. The population was 252 as of 2010. There are 2 streets.

Geography 
Perovo is located on the right bank of the Klyazma River, 18 km east of Vyazniki (the district's administrative centre) by road. Ilyina Gora is the nearest rural locality.

References 

Rural localities in Vyaznikovsky District
Vyaznikovsky Uyezd